The Antipolo Pilgrims are a baseball team competing in North Division of the Baseball Philippines competition.

External links
Baseball Philippines Official Site: Antipolo Pilgrims

Baseball Philippines
Baseball teams in the Philippines
Sports in Rizal
Antipolo